Al-Zawiya, was a Palestinian Arab village in the District of Baysan. It was depopulated by the Israel Defense Forces during the 1948 Arab-Israeli War on May 15–18, 1948 under Operation Gideon. It was located 11.5 km northeast of Baysan. The Crusader Castle Belvoir is located close to the village.

History
It was classified as a hamlet in the Palestine Index Gazetteer.

References

Bibliography

External links
 Welcome To al-Zawiya, Khirbat
 Khirbat al-Zawiya, Zochrot
Survey of Western Palestine, map 9:   IAA, Wikimedia commons

Arab villages depopulated during the 1948 Arab–Israeli War